Russell Stuvaints Jr., (born August 28, 1980) is a former American football defensive back. He formerly played for the Pittsburgh Steelers and the New England Patriots of the National Football League (NFL) and Team Arkansas of the All American Football League (AAFL). He won Super Bowl XL with the Steelers, beating Matt Hasselbeck and the Seattle Seahawks.

High school career
Stuvaints attended McKeesport Area High School where he played football for the Tigers under the guidance of coach George Smith. He holds several school records at McKeesport.

College years
Russell attended Youngstown State University and was a student and a letterman in football. In football, as a junior, he was a second-team All-Gateway Football Conference selection and an Honorable Mention All-America selection. As a senior, he was an All-Gateway Conference Honorable Mention selection.

Professional career

NFL
Although billed as a defensive back, Russell performed most notably on special teams throughout his NFL career. He was a member of the Super Bowl XL champion Steelers although he sat out due to a knee injury. He was signed to the New England Patriots practice squad after being released by the Steelers on September 7th, 2004. He was released by New England after one week and was resigned by the Steelers and promoted to the 53 man roster.

AAFL
Stuvaints signed with the All American Football League to play for Team Arkansas.

Shooting
On June 1, 2008, Stuvaints was injured during an altercation at Nigro's Restaurant in North Versailles, Pennsylvania. Stuvaints, who was shot once in the right hip, was one of five people wounded during the incident. The next day, police arrested Tyrone Watson, a 27-year-old from McKeesport, and charged him with five counts of aggravated assault, five counts of reckless endangerment, and one count of carrying an unlicensed firearm.
Stuvaints attended the preliminary hearing and told the judges that Tyrone Watson was not the shooter nor was he present in Nigro's. The Judge finally listened to all 5 people that were shot all testified that Watson was not the shooter.
Tyrone Watson was also found not guilty of the shooting, it was also found that he was not even present in the bar at the time.

Arrests
In 2016 Stuvaints was arrested in White Oak, PA on drug charges and weapons violations, according to police. He also pleaded guilty in 2013 to charges of aggravated assault and resisting arrest, a year after police said they had to use a Taser to subdue Stuvaints after he threatened a woman in McKeesport. He allegedly punched one officer in the face before he was subdued, according to the Tribune-Review.

References

1980 births
Living people
Sportspeople from McKeesport, Pennsylvania
American football defensive backs
Youngstown State Penguins football players
Pittsburgh Steelers players
Players of American football from Pennsylvania